The 1904–05 team finished with a record 6–3. It was the second year for head coach Wilbur P. Bowen. The team captain was Edward O’Brien and the team manager was Herbert Chapman.

Roster

Schedule

|-
!colspan=9 style="background:#006633; color:#FFFFFF;"| Non-conference regular season

1. Media guide shows score of 12-44 and yearbook shows 14-54.
2. EMU shows score of 22-29 and Adrian shows score of 20-19.
3. EMU doesn't show this game but Adrian does.

References

Eastern Michigan Eagles men's basketball seasons
Michigan State Normal